Koninklijke Sportkring Voorwaarts Zwevezele is a football club based in Zwevezele, West Flanders, Belgium. The club is affiliated to the Royal Belgian Football Association (KBVB) with matricule 6039 and has yellow and black as club colours.

Recent history
The first women's team was promoted to the Belgian Women's First Division for the first time in the 2018–19 season, and the men's team play in the Belgian Division 2. In 2018, the team was promoted to the national divisions, after it won the Belgian First Provincial. In the 2018–19 season, the team won the first and third period title in Belgian Third Amateur Division A, which allowed them to participate in the final round for promotion. That final round was won after wins over Sint-Lenaarts and Lyra-Lierse. The team thus promoted to the Belgian Second Amateur Division – its fifth promotion in six seasons.

After reaching promotion, former Belgian international Stijn De Smet signed with the club. At that point, other former notable former professional players had also moved to Zwevezele, including Vincent Provoost, Hans Cornelis, Stijn Minne, Niels Coussement and Tim Smolders.

On 21 January 2022, Zwevezele withdrew from the Belgian national divisions after not renewing their license for the 2022–23 season.

References

External links 
 

Football clubs in Belgium
Sport in West Flanders
Association football clubs established in 1957
1957 establishments in Belgium
Football clubs in Antwerp
Organisations based in Belgium with royal patronage